The Henderson Silver Knights are a professional ice hockey team based in Henderson, Nevada, that began play in the 2020–21 American Hockey League (AHL) season. The team plays its home games at the Dollar Loan Center in Henderson, Nevada. The team is an owned-and-operated affiliate of the Vegas Golden Knights.

History
The franchise began in 1971 as the Tidewater/Virginia Wings in the Norfolk, Virginia of the greater Hampton Roads area. The team played in Virginia as an owned and operated affiliate of the Detroit Red Wings until 1975 where after a two year suspension they moved to Glens Falls, New York as the Adirondack Red Wings. In 1999, the Red Wings suspended operations of the team. The franchise remained dormant until 2002, when it was purchased by the ownership of the NBA's San Antonio Spurs and resurrected as the San Antonio Rampage. The team then spent the next eighteen years in San  Antonio. 

On February 6, 2020, the Vegas Golden Knights announced it had purchased the franchise from the Spurs with the intent to relocate it to the Las Vegas area. The purchase and relocation was approved by the league on February 28. The team was announced to initially play at the Orleans Arena in Paradise, Nevada, while the club's new 6,000-seat arena is constructed at the site of the Henderson Pavilion in Henderson, Nevada.

On May 28, 2020, the Vegas Golden Knights announced that the team will be called the Henderson Silver Knights. The team is named for Nevada's nickname "The Silver State" and adopted the slogan "Home Means Henderson," inspired by the Nevada state song "Home Means Nevada." On August 31, 2020, Emanuel Viveiros was announced as the club's initial head coach. The start of the Silver Knights' inaugural season was delayed due to the COVID-19 pandemic. On February 5, 2021, the team named Patrick Brown as their first captain a day before their inaugural game of the 2020–21 AHL season. The Silver Knights finished their first regular season earning the top seed in the Pacific Division. The Pacific Division was the only division in the AHL that chose to have a postseason, and the teams had a playoff for the John D. Chick Trophy and division title. As the top seed, the team earned a bye to the semifinals, where they swept the San Jose Barracuda in two games before losing the division championship to the second seeded Bakersfield Condors in three games.

When the 2021–22 season schedule was released, it was revealed the Silver Knights would begin play in Henderson earlier than expected with the first home game at the new Dollar Loan Center to take place on April 2, 2022. In the 2022 AHL Calder Cup Playoffs, The Silver Knights lost in the 1st round to the Colorado Eagles in a 2-0 series sweep.

Season-by-season records

Players

Current roster 
Updated March 13, 2023.

|}

Team captains 

 Patrick Brown, 2020–21
 Ryan Murphy, 2021–22
 Brayden Pachal, 2022–present

References

External links
 

Henderson Silver Knights
Sports teams in Las Vegas
Ice hockey clubs established in 2020
Ice hockey teams in Nevada
2020 establishments in Nevada
Vegas Golden Knights minor league affiliates